Vokhtoga is a rural locality (a village) in Vokhtozhskoye Rural Settlement, Gryazovetsky District, Vologda Oblast, Russia. The population was 21 as of 2002.

Geography 
Vokhtoga is located 61 km southeast of Gryazovets (the district's administrative centre) by road. Vaganovo is the nearest rural locality.

References 

Rural localities in Gryazovetsky District